"Mutant Massacre" was a 1986 Marvel Comics crossover storyline. It primarily involved the superhero teams the X-Men and X-Factor. The solo hero Thor, the New Mutants, Power Pack and Daredevil crossed over for an issue each in their own comic books.

The crossover was a surprise success, yielding sales boosts to the mutant-based books and prompting Marvel Comics' long-running policy of holding such mutant crossovers annually.

Plot
The mysterious Marauders attack a mutant named Tommy and her Hellfire Club boyfriend in Los Angeles for the purpose of following her back to New York and finding the location of the underground mutant community known as the Morlocks. The Marauders kill Tommy and hundreds of Morlocks before the X-Men and X-Factor teams arrive separately and fight them, avoiding the total slaughter of the Morlocks. The two teams however do not meet during the battle and suffer crippling losses: X-Factor's Angel is crucified by the Marauders, while the X-Men's Colossus, Shadowcat, and Nightcrawler are all severely wounded. X-Factor's casualties are less due to the arrival of Power Pack and Thor, who help save the horribly wounded Angel and the rest of X-Factor from suffering any additional harm.

Thor uses his powers to cleanse the dead from the Morlock tunnels with fire, which causes problems for the X-Men, who briefly believe that the firestorm was caused by the Marauders and believe that the New Mutants died in said fire. Several Morlocks, including Berzerker and Masque, make their way into the surface world and begin to work for their personal aims.

Meanwhile, Wolverine saves the Power Pack and Healer from the Marauder Sabretooth. After their clash, Sabretooth follows Logan home to the X-Mansion. He destroys Cerebro, but is kept from hurting the other Morlocks when Psylocke engages Sabretooth in battle. Wolverine and the rest of the X-Men arrive, and Sabretooth falls off a nearby cliff in order to escape the X-Men, pursued into the water by Wolverine. As the fight continues in the ocean, Psylocke is able to glean some information about the Marauders from Sabretooth's mind.

Reading order

Uncanny X-Men
Uncanny X-Men #210 (Prologue)
Uncanny X-Men #211
New Mutants #46
Uncanny X-Men #212
Uncanny X-Men #213

X-Factor
X-Factor #9 (Prologue)
X-Factor #10
Thor #373
Power Pack #27
Thor #374
X-Factor #11

Daredevil
Daredevil #238 is set after the events of the Mutant Massacre. The issue features Daredevil fighting Sabretooth after his escape from the X-Mansion.

Consequences

Angel is pinned to the wall by Harpoon and Blockbuster, causing massive trauma to his wings, which are later amputated following the onset of gangrene. He eventually has his wings replaced by Apocalypse and becomes Archangel.
During the Massacre, Apocalypse also saves Plague from Harpoon and recruits her for his Horsemen.
Shadowcat becomes trapped in her phased form while protecting Rogue from Harpoon. This results in a molecular deterioration that almost kills her. She is saved at the last minute by Reed Richards and Doctor Doom.
Wounded by Riptide's throwing stars, Colossus is briefly quadriplegic as a result of Magneto using his powers to heal the damage.
Nightcrawler, already badly injured after a battle with Nimrod, is left comatose after being ambushed by Riptide.
The Morlock Masque assumes control over the diminished Morlocks who return to the tunnels after the "Inferno" event. He uses his flesh altering powers to forcibly disfigure all Morlocks under his rule, an act that causes many Morlocks to go insane.
Wolverine discovers that Jean Grey is alive after smelling her scent in the tunnels, but keeps the knowledge a secret from the rest of the X-Men.
After proving her bravery in fighting Sabretooth, Psylocke is officially welcomed as a member of the X-Men.
It is later revealed that Sinister had the Morlocks killed because they were experimentations of the Dark Beast, a version of McCoy who was Sinister's 'student' in the alternate timeline of the Age of Apocalypse and trapped in the prime reality twenty years in the past. As Sinister recognized his work in the Morlocks, he had them destroyed to keep his secrets out.
It was also later revealed that Gambit was employed by Mister Sinister to assemble the Marauders. Gambit is temporarily expelled from the X-Men for his part in the massacre.

Death list
Here is the list of Morlocks that were killed during the Mutant Massacre and the issue they were killed in:

Hundreds of other Morlocks were killed, but were not identified in the comics. Annalee and Piper were the only established characters among the casualties; the others were all generic characters whose sole purpose was to be victims of the massacre. This aspect of the story was satirized in What The--?! #4.

Background and creation
Writer Chris Claremont originally conceived the systematic killing of the Morlocks as a storyline that would run in the pages of Uncanny X-Men, but X-Factor writer Louise Simonson felt that such a big storyline would run overlong in a single title, and suggested that it be done as a crossover between all three mutant titles.

Claremont and Simonson, the chief writers of the crossover, exchanged copies of their typewritten plots and scripts, and extensively discussed the intersecting storylines over the telephone. Asked what it was like to coordinate all the Mutant Massacre-linked stories, Simonson said "It was horrible. I don't know why we're thinking of doing this again."

Walt Simonson, who wrote the Thor instalments of "Mutant Massacre" and pencilled the X-Factor instalments, said:

Collected editions

In other media
In The Gifted episode "calaMity", The Purifiers murdering all of the Morlocks in their tunnels was the premise of the "Mutant Massacre" storyline.

References

External links

Mutant Massacre— guide by Mike Phillips.

Comics by Chris Claremont
Comics by Louise Simonson
Comics by Walt Simonson
New Mutants